Thomas Pichlmann (born 24 April 1981) is an Austrian footballer, who last played as a striker for Innsbruck.

Club career
Pichlmann first made his name at Second Division DSV Leoben before moving to top flight outfit SV Pasching. In 2006, he joined Austria Wien, winning the domestic cup final in which he was a late substitute. He 
joined Grosseto of Serie B in the middle of the 2007–2008 season, after he had just played 1 game for the Austria Wien senior side earlier that season due to injury.

On 31 August 2010 he left for Verona for €350,000 transfer fee in 3-year contract. On 15 July 2012 he was signed by Serie B club Spezia.

Pichlmann returned to Austria in summer 2013. He played 5 out of first 6 games of 2014–15 Austrian Football Bundesliga, however on 28 August 2014 he returned to Italy for former club Grosseto, now a Serie C club.

International career
He made his international debut for Austria on 8 February 2005 in a friendly match against Cyprus.

Honours

Austria Wien

 Austrian Cup: 2006–07

References

External links
 Thomas Pichlmann - Official Website
Rapid stats - Rapid Archive
Profile - Austria Archive

1981 births
Living people
Footballers from Vienna
Association football forwards
Austrian footballers
Austria international footballers
Austrian expatriate footballers
SK Rapid Wien players
First Vienna FC players
DSV Leoben players
ASKÖ Pasching players
FK Austria Wien players
F.C. Grosseto S.S.D. players
Hellas Verona F.C. players
Spezia Calcio players
SC Wiener Neustadt players
FC Wacker Innsbruck (2002) players
Austrian Football Bundesliga players
Serie B players
2. Liga (Austria) players
Expatriate footballers in Italy
Austrian expatriate sportspeople in Italy